Cambodia participated at the 2018 Summer Youth Olympics in Buenos Aires, Argentina from 6 October to 18 October 2018.

Competitors
The following is the list of number of competitors participating at the Games per sport/discipline.

Badminton

Cambodia was given a quota to compete by the tripartite committee.

Singles

Team

Swimming

Wrestling

Key:
  – Victory by Fall
  – Without any points scored by the opponent
  – With point(s) scored by the opponent
  – Without any points scored by the opponent
  – With point(s) scored by the opponent

References

2018 in Cambodian sport
Nations at the 2018 Summer Youth Olympics
Cambodia at the Youth Olympics